John Stanley Beetham Bruges (18 May 1889 – 29 December 1948) was a New Zealand cricketer. He played first-class cricket for Canterbury and Otago between 1908 and 1915. Bruges was educated at Christ's College from 1898 to 1907. He died in Christchurch on 29 December 1948, and was buried at Sydenham Cemetery.

References

External links
 

1889 births
1948 deaths
New Zealand cricketers
Canterbury cricketers
Otago cricketers
Cricketers from Christchurch
People educated at Christ's College, Christchurch
Burials at Sydenham Cemetery